¡Asu mare! 3 is a 2018 Peruvian comedy film directed by Jorge Ulloa. Sequel to ¡Asu mare! and Asu mare 2, starring Carlos Alcántara. It premiered on 22 November 2018 in Peruvian theaters.

Plot 
Asu mare! 3 is located in Miami in which the protagonist obtained the visa to travel to said city. Cachín (Carlos Alcántara) and Emilia (Emilia Drago) expect a new addition to the lives of newlyweds by taking a vacation with friends. However, they run into his ex-girlfriend unexpectedly and plans change. To avoid misunderstandings with the Alcántaras and Rizo-Patrón, the spouses must live with the past of Brenda (Melania Urbina) and her new son.

Cast 

 Carlos Alcántara asimself (Cachín, "Machín")
 Emilia Drago as Emilia Rizo-Patron
 Andrés Salas as Jaime Culicich "El Culi"
 Anahí de Cárdenas as Pamela (Emilia's friend)
 Ana Cecilia Natteri as Doña Chabela
 Denisse Dibós as Elena Rizo-Patrón (Mother of Emilia)
 Javier Delgiudice as Felipe Rizo-Patrón (Father of Emilia)
 Franco Cabrera as "Lechuga" (Cachín's friend)
 Ricardo Mendoza as "Tarrón" (Cachín's friend)
 Miguel Vergara as "El Chato" (Cachín's friend)
 Patricia Portocarrero as Florencia (Employee of the Rizo-Boss)
 Melania Urbina as Brenda
 Alessandro Durand as Kevin
 Pietro Sibille as Taxi driver
 Haydeé Cáceres
 Katy Esquivel
 Orlando Herrera
 Katia Condos
 Rodolfo Carrion "Felpudini"
 Christian Meier
 Monserrat Brugué
 Carlos Carlín: Doctor
 Wendy Ramos
 Johanna San Miguel
 Gonzalo Torres
 Daniel Marquina
 Lilian Schiappa as Secretary

Production 

After the success of the first 2 parts, Carlos Alcántara announced a third installment to "give a definitive ending to the story". The shooting of the film began in May 2018. The director is Jorge Ulloa, who directs Enchufe.tv, replacing Ricardo Maldonado. According to Ulloa, he first met Alcántará after the success of Patacláun in Ecuador.

Reception 
Attendance in its first week of release was 540,000 viewers, down from its prequel which reached 700,000. It ended with more than 2 million, the second most watched of 2018 and surpassed by Avengers: Infinity War. On 13 June 2020, after its re-release for América Televisión, it was the most watched of the day with 18 points according to RPP. It became the highest grossing film of 2018 with a gross of $2.3 million.

Spin-off sequel 
Despite Carlos Alcántara's initial refusal, a fourth film by ¡Asu mare! was confirmed at the end of 2021 and it was declared that it would be a spin-off film titled ¡Asu mare! Los amigos. Its premiere is scheduled for February 9, 2023 in Peruvian theaters.

References

External links 

 

2018 films
2018 comedy films
Peruvian comedy films
Tondero Producciones films
2010s Peruvian films
2010s Spanish-language films

Films set in Peru
Films shot in Peru
Films set in Miami
Films shot in Miami
Films about comedians
Films about parenting
Films about travel
Peruvian sequel films